Spirotropis carinata is a fossil species of sea snail, a marine gastropod mollusk in the family Drilliidae.

Taxonomy
The name Spirotropis carinata has been misapplied to a Recent species from the Atlantic coasts of Europe. The true carinata is a fossil species from the Mediterranean. The valid name for the Recent species is Spirotropis confusa.

Description
The white shell shows whorls slightly excavated above, angulated and carinated on the periphery. The sinus is broad, deep and remarkably distinct, with the upper edge thickened.

Distribution
This fossil species was found in the Mediterranean Sea

References

 Warén, Anders. "Spirotropis sarsi, new name for Spirotropis carinata Sars, 1878 (Gastropoda: Prosobranchia)." Sarsia 59.1 (1975): 49–52.
  Tucker, J.K. 2004 Catalog of recent and fossil turrids (Mollusca: Gastropoda). Zootaxa 682:1–1295

External links
 Bivona-Bernardi And., 1838. Generi e specie di molluschi descritti dal Barone Antonio Bivona e Bernardi. Lavori postumi pubblicati dal figlio Andrea dottore in medicina con note ed aggiunte. Giornale di Scienze Lettere e Arti per la Sicilia 61: 211–227

carinata